Ayom Majok (born 1 January 2003) is an Australian professional footballer who plays as a forward for Brisbane Roar.

Club career
Majok played youth football for West Adelaide after impressing them at school trials. He later joined Adelaide United's NPL squad, but didn't play for long and quit. He then restarted his career at Cumberland United, first as a reserves player before gaining a chance in the first team, for whom he scored 9 goals in 21 games.

In December 2020, Majok joined professional A-League Men club Western United on a two-year scholarship contract. He and the club mutually terminated his contract in February 2022 after he played only one A-League game. He moved to Adelaide City in April 2022.

Following his contribution in Adelaide City’s 2022 season which saw them win the premiership and championship in NPL South Australia, Brisbane Roar signed Majok on a youth development agreement. Majok made his senior debut for the Brisbane Roar as a substitute in the 78th minute, replacing Joseph Knowles, in a game against Melbourne City which ended in a 0-0 draw. Majok was given the number 99.

References

External links

2003 births
Living people
Australian soccer players
Association football midfielders
West Adelaide SC players
Adelaide United FC players
Cumberland United FC players
Western United FC players
Adelaide City FC players
Brisbane Roar FC players
National Premier Leagues players
A-League Men players
South Sudanese emigrants to Australia
Australian people of South Sudanese descent
Sportspeople of South Sudanese descent